Anathallis ariasii is a species of orchid endemic to Peru.

References

ariasii
Endemic flora of Peru
Plants described in 1997